Bradley Fish (b. Bethesda, Maryland, 1970) is an American born musician based in Israel.  He relocated to Israel in 2004, first living in Tel Aviv, and finally settling in Jerusalem.

He holds a B.A. degree in guitar from Northern Illinois University, where he studied with jazz guitarist Fareed Haque.

Fish's musical loops performed on the Appalachian dulcimer, banjo, German concert zither, and guzheng (Chinese zither) are the most widespread in the world. The loops are created by recording the actual playing of the instrument and then slicing riffs with music editing software, and used by modern composers as an enhancement or as a basis for their own music. Fish's loops have been released with Sony Pictures Digital, Peace Love Productions, and Apple iLife.

Fish combined many of these exotic and folk instruments with electronics in modern musical contexts (rock, reggae, metal, fusion, blues, electronica, modern folk, etc.) recording The Aquarium Conspiracy CD with Sugarcubes/Björk drummer Sigtryggur Baldursson and multi-instrumentalist Biff Blumfumgagnge in 1996. Fish is now performing and creating [video footage]  of his jam band style one-man live looping.

Fish recorded via the Internet for a Bigga Haitian record with George Clinton/Funkadelic/Snoop Doggy Dogg drummer Jerome Bailey, Bob Marley's replacement in The Wailers, Yvad, and  Jerry Johnson - the sax player behind Steel Pulse, Queen Latifah, and Burning Spear's 2009 Grammy winning ‘Jah Is Real’ CD. He has pioneered the use of the Internet as a medium for recording tracks of guitars and exotic instruments as well as musical instruction. The Jerusalem Post referred to Fish as a "master guitar teacher."

Fish shocked his "hippie" and left-leaning fan base, playing live twice on Fox News  w/ Gov. Mike Huckabee including a jam w/50's superstar  Pat Boone. Boone complemented Fish's "growling" vocals and lyrical improv ability publicly in the Jerusalem Post. Fish has toured internationally, performing for many notables including the Dalai Lama. He has recorded tracks with top name artists in Israel including Rami Kleinstein, Arkadi Duchin and Yehuda Poliker. Fish's live shows in Israel have included Jon Shapiro of Ofra Haza's final live band. Bradley's videos of edgy music comedy and unorthodox techniques on ethnic instruments have sparked controversy in internet forums including the YouTube comments themselves.

Bradley Fish is working as a session musician, producer and/or co-writer for a number of artists including Fox News reporter Mike Tobin, singer Michelle Cohn, and Dan Reed of the Dan Reed Network. He has also done soundtracks for videos for the Orthodox Union and Chabad of Australia. He reports on his website that he will be touring in support of a new CD soon.

References

External links
Bradley Fish official site
Bradley Fish MySpace Page
Videos of Bradley Fish performing
"New dude on the block", by Gavriel Fiske, from The Jerusalem Post, February 23, 2006
"Arrivals: From Madison, Wisconsin, to Jerusalem", by Yocheved Miriam Russo, from The Jerusalem Post, March 15, 2006
Bradley Fish Electrifried Band website
"Listen Up" in Jerusalem Post, Pat Boone story
Apple iLife
Peace Love Productions
Sony Digital Pictures

1970 births
Living people
American banjoists
Guzheng players
Northern Illinois University alumni
People from Bethesda, Maryland
American emigrants to Israel
Guitarists from Maryland
American male guitarists
21st-century American singers
21st-century American guitarists
21st-century American male singers